Terra Nullius is a 2017 speculative fiction novel by Claire G. Coleman. It draws from Australia's colonial history, describing a society split into "Natives" and "Settlers."

Publication history
2017, Australia, Hachette Australia 
2017, USA, Small Beer Press

Reception
Judges of the Stella Prize called Terra Nullius "an arresting and original novel", while a reviewer for the Sydney Review of Books described it as "a cleverly multiplicitous text" and "an ambitious mirror for settler Australia".

Terra Nullius has also been reviewed by Australian Book Review, Publishers Weekly, Locus, Antipodes, The Adelaide Review, ArtsHub, Kirkus Reviews, and Library Journal.

Awards and nominations
 2019 Neukom Institute Literary Arts Awards Debut shortlist
 2019 International Dublin Literary Award longlist
 2018 Victorian Premier's Prize for Fiction highly commended
 2018 Tin Duck Award for Best Professional Long Written Work winner
 2018 Stella Prize shortlist
 2018 Reading Women Award fiction shortlist
 2018 Norma K. Hemming Award Long Work winner
 2018 MUD Literary Prize finalist
 2018 Australian Indie Book of the Year Debut Fiction longlist
 2018 Ditmar Award Best New Talent nomination
 2018 Australian Book Industry Awards Matt Richell award for new writer of the year shortlist
 2017 Aurealis Award for best science fiction novel shortlist
 2016 black&write! Indigenous Writers Fellowship winner

See also
 The Old Lie

References

External links
Library holdings of Terra Nullius
Guardian interview with Coleman about Terra Nullius

2017 Australian novels
2017 debut novels
Australian science fiction novels
2017 science fiction novels
Novels about colonialism
Novels set in Australia
Indigenous Australian science fiction
Hachette Book Group books
Small Beer Press books